Chartway Arena at the Ted Constant Convocation Center is a , multi-purpose arena in Norfolk, Virginia, United States, on the campus of Old Dominion University. It is operated by Spectra Venue Management. Chartway Arena is part of the University Village project, a  development that features a shopping center that includes restaurants, offices, research labs and residences with connections to the campus. It has 7,319 seats, 862 upper club/priority seats, 16 suites, and a jumbotron scoreboard. 

"The Ted" was designed by Michigan-based architecture firm Rossetti and seats 8,639 for basketball games and 9,520 for concerts. In addition to its use for home basketball games and cheerleading competitions, the complex is used to host family-oriented events as well as concerts, lectures, graduation ceremonies, and career fairs.

Basketball

Men's basketball
Through the 2018–19 season, the Old Dominion Monarchs men's basketball team has a record of 212–66 at the Constant Center for a winning percentage of 76.3%.

Women's basketball
On March 17 and 19, 2012, the Ted hosted the first and second round of the 2012 NCAA Women's Division I Basketball Tournament.

Other events
Chartway Arena has hosted concerts and shows by Bruce Springsteen, Bob Dylan, BB King, Dave Chappelle, Elton John, J. Cole, Mike Epps, Thomas and Friends and Green Day. Many other tour-based events such as the Harlem Globetrotters, Disney On Ice performances, Impact Wrestling TV tapings, and UFC events have came to the arena. On October 20, 2003, the facility hosted an NBA preseason matchup between the Philadelphia 76ers and the New Orleans Hornets. On November 17, 2021, All Elite Wrestling taped episodes of their weekly television shows AEW Dynamite and AEW Rampage in the arena.

The largest event that took place at the arena was the Elton John concert on March 18, 2011. Tickets for this event sold out in under 4 hours. The Ted had to add around 1,000 additional seats to accommodate all of the audience members who purchased tickets.

Operations
Chartway Arena is managed by OVG360, a division of Oak View Group. In June 2019, Chartway Federal Credit Union made a $4.25 million branding and sponsorship agreement with Old Dominion to get the arena named, which is located inside the Ted Constant Convocation Center complex.

In 2015, the arena received upgraded video systems throughout the stadium including a digital scoreboard from Daktronics. In 2021, a newly constructed, full-service Starbucks location opened inside the complex, located on the 43rd Street side of the venue near Hampton Blvd.

See also
 List of NCAA Division I basketball arenas

References

College basketball venues in the United States
College wrestling venues in the United States
Old Dominion Monarchs basketball
Basketball venues in Virginia
Sports venues in Norfolk, Virginia
Sports venues completed in 2002
2002 establishments in Virginia
Buildings and structures in Norfolk, Virginia